Mundie & Jensen was an architectural firm in Chicago, Illinois.  Several of its works are listed on the National Register of Historic Places (NRHP).

It was a partnership of William Bryce Mundie (April 30, 1863 - March 27, 1939) and Elmer C. Jensen (March 18, 1870 - April 24, 1955).  Mundie was a draftsman from Canada who worked in Chicago for William Le Baron Jenney (1832–1907) "father of the American skyscraper", and joined him as partner in 1891.

Associated firms were:
 Jenney & Mundie, 1891 to 1904
 Jenney, Mundie & Jensen, 1905 to late 1906
 Mundie & Jensen 1907 to 1935
 Mundie, Jensen, Bourke & Havens 1936 to 1939

Works by the firm and/or one of its partners include (with attribution):
Consumers Building (1913), 220 S. State St., Chicago, IL (Jenney, Mundie & Jensen)
International Tailoring Company Building (1915-16), 847 W. Jackson Blvd., Chicago, IL (Mundie & Jensen), NRHP-listed
Ludington Building (1892}, 1104 S. Wabash Ave., Chicago, IL (Jenney & Mundie), NRHP-listed
Municipal Courts Building (1906-07), 116 S. Michigan Ave., Chicago, IL (Jenny, Mundie & Jensen), NRHP-listed
National City Bank (1913), 227 Main St., Evansville, Indiana (Mundie & Jennie), NRHP-listed
Singer Building (1908), 120 S. State St., Chicago, IL (William Bryce Mundie; Elmer C. Jensen), NRHP-listed

Architect and engineer Paul V. Hyland, who worked as a supervisor for several Chicago area firms, worked for the firm at some time.

For William Le Baron Jenney or William LeBaron Jenney or William Jenney or William Le Baron Jenny (all redirect to one article), there are:
Leiter II Building, NE corner of S. State and E. Congress Sts., Chicago, IL (Jenny, Maj. William Le Baron) 
First Congregational Church, 412 S. 4th St. Manistee, MI Jenney, William 
Garfield Park, 100 N. Central Park Ave. Chicago, IL Jenney, William Le Baron 
Humboldt Park, Roughly bounded by N. Sacramento and Augusta Blvds., and N. Kedzie, North and N. California Aves. and W. Division St. Chicago, IL Le Baron Jenney, William 
Manhattan Building, 431 S. Dearborn St. Chicago, IL Jenney, William LeBaron 
Metropolitan Block, 772 Main St. Lake Geneva, WI Jenney, William LeBaron

The Elmer C. Jensen House (1905), in the Old Irving Park neighborhood of Chicago, was designed by and for Jensen, and is now a house museum.

References

Defunct architecture firms based in Chicago